Mahalingam Venkat Raman (26 June 1913— 1980s/90s) was an Indian film director, editor and writer who was active mainly in Tamil and Hindi cinema.

Life 
M. V. Raman was the son of a lawyer. Though he originally graduated in the field of accounts, he later took to cinema in the late 1930s. Beginning his career as an editor, Raman later indulged in writing and directing. He worked as associate director and storywriter on the Tamil film Vaazhkai (1949), and was responsible for casting Vyjayanthimala as the lead actress, her feature film debut. He later directed the film's Telugu and Hindi remakes Jeevitham (1950) and Bahar (1951), and after the latter's success remained active mainly in Bombay, while occasionally returning to his native Tamil Nadu. He established Raman Productions in the 1950s, and went on to direct numerous successful films including Aasha (1957), its Tamil remake Athisaya Penn (1957), Konjum Salangai (1962) and Pattanathil Bhootham (1967). In 1991, historian Randor Guy wrote that Raman, despite his success in the film industry, "faded away soon for reasons of his own making, and died some years ago". Raman was married to V. Meenakshi, who died in 1993.

Filmography

References

External links 
 
 
 

1913 births
20th-century deaths
20th-century Indian film directors
Film directors from Tamil Nadu
Indian filmmakers
People from Tiruchirappalli
Tamil screenwriters
Year of death uncertain